Mian Imtiaz Ahmad (born 14 April 1961) is a Pakistani politician who had been a member of the National Assembly of Pakistan, from June 2013 to May 2018. Previously he had been a member of the Provincial Assembly of Punjab from 1993 to 1999.

Early life
He was born on 14 April 1961.

Political career
Ahmad was elected to the Provincial Assembly of Punjab as a candidate of Pakistan Muslim League (N) (PML-N) from Constituency PP-237 (Rahim Yar Khan-VI) in 1993 Pakistani general election. He received 42,851 votes and defeated Irfan Abdullah, a candidate of Pakistan Peoples Party (PPP).

He was re-elected to the Provincial Assembly of Punjab as a candidate of PML-N from Constituency PP-237 (Rahim Yar Khan-VI) in 1997 Pakistani general election. He received 44,119 votes and defeated Tariq Mehmood Chaudhry, a candidate of PPP.

He ran for the seat of the National Assembly of Pakistan as an independent candidate from Constituency NA-196 (Rahim Yar Khan-V) in 2008 Pakistani general election but was unsuccessful. He received 47,205 votes and lost the seat to Javed Iqbal Warraich.

He joined PML-N in 2011.

He was re-elected to the National Assembly as a candidate of PML-N Constituency NA-196 (Rahim Yar Khan-V) in 2013 Pakistani general election. He received 106,595 votes and defeated Javed Iqbal Warraich. During his tenure as Member of the National Assembly, he served as the Federal Parliamentary Secretary for Ports and Shipping.

References

Living people
Pakistan Muslim League (N) politicians
Punjabi people
Pakistani MNAs 2013–2018
1961 births
Punjab MPAs 1993–1996
Punjab MPAs 1997–1999